Tejal Sanjay Hasabnis (born 16 August 1997) is a Maharashtrian cricketer. She plays for Maharashtra and West Zone. She has played 3 First-class matches, 22 Limited over matches and 22 Women's Twenty20. In January 2019, she was named in India Green team for the 2018–19 Senior Women's Challenger Trophy.

References 

1997 births
Living people
Maharashtra women cricketers
West Zone women cricketers